Saint John the Evangelist is a 1635–1636 painting by Francesco Furini, which has been in the Museum of Fine Arts of Lyon since 1987.

It was inspired by the work of Caravaggio and was commissioned by the painter's patron marquess Vitelli. The facial features show it was based on the same model as the artist's Apollo the Archer (Columbia University) and for various female allegorical figures.

Sources

Italian paintings
Furini
1635 paintings
1636 paintings
Paintings in the collection of the Museum of Fine Arts of Lyon
Books in art